Alberto Cova (born 1 December 1958) is a retired Italian long-distance track athlete, winner of the 10,000 m at the 1984 Summer Olympics and 1983 World Championships.

Biography
Born in Inverigo, province of Como, Italy, Alberto Cova was characterized by his superiority in the sprint finish, and the only way to nullify this was to set a very fast pace from the start to finish.
Cova got his first fame at the 1982 European Championships in Athens, where he surprisingly outsprinted the main favourite Werner Schildhauer from East Germany, to win his first international championship title. In the next year, Cova wasn't the main favourite at the first World Championships held in Helsinki, being considered only as a possible medal winner. The 10,000 m final at Helsinki was run in slow pace, with thirteen runners still in a leading pack at the bell. With only 30 metres to go, Cova was only in fifth place, but then sprinted forward to win. Schildhauer finished in second place.  The top four runners sprinted to the finish line in 0.33 seconds (see Yleisurheilun MM-kisat Helsingissä / Athletics World Championships in Helsinki, edited by the Juoksija/Runner magazine, Helsinki:  1983).

The 10,000 m final at the Los Angeles Olympics began at an even slower pace than at Helsinki. At the 6 km mark, Martti Vainio from Finland, picked up the speed. Cova managed to follow him, and Vainio couldn't sustain his own pace, so Cova swept past him after the bell and sprinted to the line to win his last international title (see, for example, Tapio Pekola et al., eds., Suuri Suomalainen Olympiakirja/The Great Finnish Olympic Book, Helsinki:  Juoksija-lehti (Runner magazine)/Laaseri, 1984).

At the 1986 European Championships in Stuttgart, Cova was beaten at his own game, when he was outsprinted by fellow countryman Stefano Mei on the last lap of the 10,000 m final. Cova never won a major race after that, and came tenth in his heat (thereby failing to qualify for the final) at the 1988 Summer Olympics in Seoul. This was his last international competition.

In the 1983 World Athletics Championships 10,000-metre final, there actually were seven men in the lead group at the bell (see the
related video clip "Finns Near the Top" / Suomalaisia lähellä huippua in the Finnish Broadcasting Corporation YLE's Living Archives
/ Elävä arkisto, with the following links:  Sports / Urheilu, Athletics / Yleisurheilu, World Championships / MM-kisat, 1983 World
Championships / MM-kisat 1983;  the website is www.yle.fi/elavaarkisto/). In the 1984 Olympics 10,000-metre final, Finland's Martti Vainio picked up the speed shortly before the 6 kilometre mark (see, for
instance, The Great Olympic Book / Suuri Olympiateos, volume 4, published in Finland in 1984).

Achievements

National titles
He won fourteen national championships at senior level.

Italian Athletics Championships
5000 m: 1980, 1982, 1983, 1985 (4)
10,000 m: 1981, 1982 (2)
Italian Athletics Indoor Championships
3000 m: 1982, 1983, 1984 (3)
Italian Cross Country Championships
Long race: 1982, 1983, 1984, 1985, 1986 (5)

See also
 FIDAL Hall of Fame
 Italy national athletics team - Multiple medalist
 Italian all-time lists - 5000 metres
 Italian all-time lists - 10000 metres

Notes

References

External links
 
 

1958 births
Living people
Sportspeople from the Province of Como
Olympic athletes of Italy
Olympic gold medalists for Italy
Italian male cross country runners
Italian male long-distance runners
Athletes (track and field) at the 1984 Summer Olympics
Athletes (track and field) at the 1988 Summer Olympics
World Athletics Championships athletes for Italy
World Athletics Championships medalists
European Athletics Championships medalists
European athletics champions for Italy
Medalists at the 1984 Summer Olympics
Olympic gold medalists in athletics (track and field)
Mediterranean Games gold medalists for Italy
Athletes (track and field) at the 1983 Mediterranean Games
Mediterranean Games medalists in athletics
World Athletics Championships winners